Monaco will compete at the 2022 European Championships in Munich from August 11 to August 22, 2022.

Competitors
The following is the list of number of competitors in the Championships::

Gymnastics

Monaco has entered one female gymnast.

Women

Qualification

Rowing

References

2022
Nations at the 2022 European Championships
European Championships